In heraldry, carnation is a tincture, the name for skin colour, more exactly the colour of pale or white human skin (i.e., pale pinkish peach).

It is rare in coats of arms in Anglophone countries but quite frequent on the European continent, in France in particular, derived from widespread use in German heraldry. In its rare appearances in Anglophone armory; it is not only used for European flesh tones as in a crown rayonny or supported by two cubit arms, dexter carnation, sinister skeletal proper (crest of The Royal Australian and New Zealand College of Radiologists) but also as a general pink colouring as in a horse passant argent bridled saddled and trappings or, on its head a plume of three feathers carnation (crest of The Worshipful Company of Saddlers, England).

References 

Colours (heraldry)
Skin pigmentation
Shades of white